Formosa do Rio Preto is the westernmost and largest (by area) city in the Brazilian state of Bahia. It is also the largest in all  Northeastern Brazil.

The municipality contains part of the  Serra Geral do Tocantins Ecological Station, a strictly protected conservation unit created in 2001 to preserve an area of cerrado.
It also contains part of the  Nascentes do Rio Parnaíba National Park, created in 2002.

References 

Municipalities in Bahia
Populated places established in 1961